William Dudley Ward PC (14 October 1877 – 11 November 1946) was an English sportsman and Liberal politician.

Early life
Dudley Ward was born in London, the son of William Humble Dudley Ward and the great-grandson of William Humble Ward, 10th Baron Ward. His mother was the Honourable Eugenie Violet Adele Brett, daughter of William Brett, 1st Viscount Esher. He was educated at Eton and Trinity College, Cambridge. At Cambridge, he was secretary of the Pitt Club.

Sporting activities

Dudley Ward rowed for Cambridge in the Boat Race in 1897, when Oxford won and as President of Cambridge University Boat Club (CUBC) he rowed in the winning Cambridge crews in the 1899 and 1900 Boat Races.

At Henley Royal Regatta he was runner up in Silver Goblets (pairs' event) in 1900 with Raymond Etherington-Smith. His crew won the Stewards' Challenge Cup in 1901. In 1902 he won the Grand Challenge Cup, the Stewards' Challenge Cup again, and the Silver Goblets partnering Claude Taylor. In 1903 his crew won the Stewards' and Grand again.

In the 1908 Summer Olympics Dudley Ward was a crew member of the British boat Sorais which won the bronze medal in the 8-metre class.

Political career
Dudley Ward was returned to Parliament for Southampton in 1906, a seat he held until 1922, and served under H. H. Asquith as Treasurer of the Household from 1909 to 1912. During World War I he was a Lieutenant Commander in the Royal Navy Volunteer Reserve, though this may have been a cover for his counter-espionage work for Admiral Sir William Reginald Hall, Director of Naval Intelligence.  He served under David Lloyd George as Vice-Chamberlain of the Household from 1917 to 1922. In 1922 he was admitted to the Privy Council.

Personal life
Dudley Ward reportedly "had a liking for the fleshpots and was known, on occasions, to turn up for training still dressed in white tie and tails." He married Winifred May "Freda" Birkin (better known under her married name of Freda Dudley Ward), daughter of Colonel Charles Wilfred Birkin, in 1913.  She was a socialite and became a mistress of Edward, Prince of Wales. The marriage produced two daughters, of whom the elder, Penelope Dudley-Ward, was a leading actress in the 1930s and 1940s.  The couple were divorced in 1931.  After retiring from politics he divided his time between England and Canada, where he was custodian of Edward, Prince of Wales's Alberta properties, primarily the E.P. Ranch, the royal's cattle ranch near Pekisko west of Calgary. An old sandstone building on Stephen Avenue where he had his offices is known as the Glanville/Ward Block. Dudley Ward died in Calgary, Alberta in November 1946, aged sixty-nine, after an operation, and is buried in the city's Union Cemetery. Freda remarried in 1937 and died in March 1983, aged eighty-eight.

See also
 List of Cambridge University Boat Race crews

References

External links 
 

1877 births
1946 deaths
People educated at Eton College
Alumni of Trinity College, Cambridge
Cambridge University Boat Club rowers
English male rowers
British sportsperson-politicians
British male sailors (sport)
Sailors at the 1908 Summer Olympics – 8 Metre
Olympic sailors of Great Britain
Olympic bronze medallists for Great Britain
Olympic medalists in sailing
Members of the Privy Council of the United Kingdom
Members of the Parliament of the United Kingdom for English constituencies
UK MPs 1906–1910
UK MPs 1910
UK MPs 1910–1918
UK MPs 1918–1922
Treasurers of the Household
William
Medalists at the 1908 Summer Olympics
Birkin family
Liberal Party (UK) MPs for English constituencies
National Liberal Party (UK, 1922) politicians